Cambridge Hospital is a community teaching hospital located in Cambridge, Massachusetts. The hospital is located at 1493 Cambridge Street, between Inman Square and Harvard Square. It is one of three hospitals that are parts of Cambridge Health Alliance.

Services
The main Cambridge Hospital campus has a wide variety of health services including:
24-hour Emergency Department
Primary Care for all ages
Cambridge Women's Health Center
Cambridge Breast Center
Maternity Care, including the Cambridge Birth Center
Medical Specialties
Surgical Specialties
Orthopaedics and Sports Medicine
Mental Health

Services highlights
Community Hospital Cancer Program, Am. College of Surgeons Commission on Cancer 
Primary Stroke Service, MA Department of Public Health

National Accreditation:
- Cambridge Breast Center, National Accreditation Program for Breast Centers
- CT Service, American College of Radiology
- Ultrasound Service, American College of Radiology
- Breast Imaging Center of Excellence, American College of Radiology
- Baby Friendly Hospital, National Baby Friendly Health Initiative

Academics
Cambridge Health Alliance is a teaching affiliate of Harvard Medical School, Harvard School of Public Health, Harvard School of Dental Medicine, and the Tufts University School of Medicine.

Training programs include:

 Harvard Internal Medicine Residency Program - a premiere academic community-based training program with emphasis on primary care in underserved populations with the flexibility of subspecialty training at other Harvard-affiliated tertiary care teaching hospitals, and in producing healthcare policy and community leaders.  The training site of Harvard Medical School Cambridge Integrated Clerkship for Harvard medical students.
 Combined Training in Internal Medicine and Occupational Medicine - a new combined four-year training program began in 2010, administered by Harvard Medical School and Harvard School of Public Health which allow residents to become board-eligible in both specialties: internal medicine and occupational (preventive) medicine and receive a Masters of Public Health Degree (MPH) at HSPH.
 Family Medicine Residency Program - affiliated with Tufts University School of Medicine.  Based in Malden, Massachusetts as one of 14 nationwide residency curriculum using the new model of residency training called Preparing the Personal Physician for Practice (P4).
 Harvard General Psychiatry Residency Program - this is one of the four Harvard Medical School Adult Psychiatric Residencies. The department serves as a popular training site for Harvard Medical students.
 Harvard Child and Adolescent Psychiatry Training Program - this is one of the three Harvard Medical School Child Psychiatric Residencies.
 CHA also training programs in Podiatric Surgery, Dentistry,  Geriatric Psychiatry, Psychology, Psychotherapy, and Psychosomatic Medicine.

References

External links
Cambridge Health Alliance website
CHA Provider Directory
Cambridge Breast Center
Cambridge Pediatrics
Cambridge Primary Care Center

Hospital buildings completed in 1971
Buildings and structures in Cambridge, Massachusetts
Harvard Medical School
Hospitals established in 1917
Hospitals in Middlesex County, Massachusetts
Teaching hospitals in Massachusetts
Inman Square